Tommy Alf Samuelsson (born January 12, 1960 in Degerfors, Sweden) is a Swedish ice hockey coach and a retired professional ice hockey player. He is currently the head coach of HV71 of HockeyAllsvenskan.

Playing career 
Samuelson spent the majority of his playing days at Färjestad BK. He won three Swedish championships (1981, 1986, 1988) with the club and received Elitserien MVP honors in 1986. At the end of his career, he spent two years with Wiener EV of Austria and a single season with SC Luzern of Switzerland. Representing the Swedish national team, he won two bronze medals at the 1980 and 1988 Winter Olympics as well as three silver medals at World Championships (1981, 1986, 1990). Samuelsson retired in 1998.

Coaching career 
From 1999 to 2004, Samuelsson served as assistant coach of Färjestad BK in Sweden's top-tier Elitserien, winning gold in 2002, before accepting the head coaching job at Austrian first-division side HC Innsbruck for the 2004-05 campaign. In the following season, he guided Skellefteå AIK to promotion from Sweden's second-tier Allsvenskan to the top-flight Swedish Hockey League (SHL).

Prior to the 2005-06 season, he returned to Färjestad, again taking on the role as assistant coach. Samuelsson took over the head coaching job in November 2007 after the sacking of Roger Melin. From 2008 to 2010, Samuelsson worked as joint-coach alongside Per-Erik Johnsson, leading the club to the Swedish national championship in 2009, while receiving SHL Coach of the Year honors. After serving as lone head coach in 2010-11, he left Färjestad for Austria, being appointed as head coach of the Vienna Capitals in March 2011. Under his guidance, the Capitals reached the EBEL finals in 2013. Samuelsson left Vienna at the end of the 2013-14 season to return to Färjestad BK. He served a two-year stint as head coach and parted company with the club in March 2016.

On July 5, 2016, Samuelsson was named head coach of ERC Ingolstadt of the German top-flight Deutsche Eishockey Liga (DEL). He was sacked in November 2017 after his team had suffered defeat in seven straight games.

Career statistics

Regular season and playoffs

International

External links
 
 
 Swedish Olympic Committee

References 

1960 births
Living people
Färjestad BK players
Ice hockey players at the 1980 Winter Olympics
Ice hockey players at the 1988 Winter Olympics
Ice hockey players with retired numbers
Olympic bronze medalists for Sweden
Olympic ice hockey players of Sweden
Olympic medalists in ice hockey
People from Degerfors Municipality
Swedish ice hockey defencemen
Wiener EV players
Sportspeople from Örebro County